Ma Yibo (born August 8, 1980 in Dalian, Liaoning) is a Chinese field hockey player who competed at the 2004, 2008 and 2012 Summer Olympics.

At the 2004 Summer Olympics, she finished fourth with the Chinese team in the women's competition. She played all six matches and scored two goals.

She was part of the Chinese team that won silver at the 2008 Beijing Games.

External links
 
Profile at Yahoo! Sports (archive)

1980 births
Living people
Chinese female field hockey players
Asian Games gold medalists for China
Asian Games medalists in field hockey
Field hockey players at the 2002 Asian Games
Field hockey players at the 2004 Summer Olympics
Field hockey players at the 2006 Asian Games
Field hockey players at the 2008 Summer Olympics
Field hockey players at the 2010 Asian Games
Field hockey players at the 2012 Summer Olympics
Medalists at the 2002 Asian Games
Medalists at the 2006 Asian Games
Medalists at the 2008 Summer Olympics
Medalists at the 2010 Asian Games
Olympic field hockey players of China
Olympic medalists in field hockey
Olympic silver medalists for China
Sportspeople from Dalian